The Racecourse Ground was a cricket ground in Swaffham, Norfolk.  The first recorded match on the ground was in 1797, when the Earl of Winchilsea's XI played C Lennox's XI in the grounds only first-class match.

Norfolk teams played on the ground from 1844 to 1850 before the formation of Norfolk County Cricket Club, with the final recorded match on the ground against the Marylebone Cricket Club.  The location of the ground is unknown.

References

1797 establishments in England
Cricket grounds in Norfolk
Cricket in Norfolk
Defunct cricket grounds in England
Defunct sports venues in Norfolk
English cricket venues in the 18th century
History of Norfolk
Norfolk
Sport in Norfolk
Sports venues completed in 1797
Sports venues in Norfolk
Swaffham